The Krông Ana River is a river of Vietnam. It flows through Đắk Lắk Province for 215 kilometres and has a basin area of 3960 km². It is the principal tributary of the Srepok River.
The Gia Long and Dray Nur Falls lie along this river.

References

Rivers of Đắk Lắk province
Rivers of Vietnam